The Tennis and Rackets Association is the governing body for the sports of real tennis and (hard) rackets in the United Kingdom.  Its first meeting was held in 1907.

Tennis courts

See: real tennis organizations

Rackets courts

Clubs

 Britannia Royal Naval College (Dartmouth)
 Seacourt (Hayling Island)
 Queen's Club (London)
 Manchester Tennis and Racquet Club
 Newcastle Rackets Court
 Royal Military Academy Sandhurst

Schools

 Charterhouse School
 Cheltenham College
 Clifton College
 Eton College
 Haileybury College
 Harrow School
 Malvern College
 Marlborough College
 Radley College
 Rugby School
 St Paul's School
 Tonbridge School
 Wellington College
 Winchester College

See also
Lawn Tennis Association
Squash Rackets Association

External links
 The Tennis & Rackets Association
 Real Tennis Online
 Rackets in the UK

1907 establishments in the United Kingdom
Organisations based in the London Borough of Hammersmith and Fulham
Rackets (sport)
Real tennis
Sport in Hammersmith and Fulham 
Sports governing bodies in the United Kingdom
Sports organizations established in 1907
West Kensington